Statistics of the French Amateur Football Championship in the 1928–29 season.

Excellence Division

Final
Olympique de Marseille 3 - Club Français 2

Honour Division
Won by US Cazérienne.

References
RSSF

French Amateur Football Championship
France
1928–29 in French football